Elmer Maddux (May 6, 1934 – November 20, 2019) was an American politician who served in the Oklahoma House of Representatives from the 58th district from 1988 to 2004.

He died on November 20, 2019, in Mooreland, Oklahoma at age 85.

References

1934 births
2019 deaths
Republican Party members of the Oklahoma House of Representatives